Events in the year 2002 in Israel.

Incumbents
 President of Israel – Moshe Katsav
 Prime Minister of Israel – Ariel Sharon
 President of the Supreme Court – Aharon Barak
 Chief of General Staff – Shaul Mofaz to July 9 Moshe Ya'alon
 Government of Israel – 29th Government of Israel

Events

January 28 – Channel 10 begins broadcasting.
March 28 – 20,000 IDF reservists called up.
 25 May – Sarit Hadad represents Israel at the Eurovision Song Contest with the song "Nadlik Beyakhad Ner" ("We'll Light a Candle Together").
May 28 – The Israeli reconnaissance satellite Ofek-5 is launched.
April 1 – 20,000 Israeli army reservists mobilized.
July 9 – Moshe Ya'alon is appointed as the 17th Chief of Staff of the Israel Defense Forces.
July 23 – The Tal Law is passed in the Knesset by a majority of 51 against 41. The law gives legal status to the continuation of the exemption from mandatory military service granted to Israeli Ultra Orthodox Jews studying at a yeshiva.
October 9 – Daniel Kahneman receives the Nobel Memorial Prize in Economics for his work in Prospect theory, becoming the first Israeli Nobel laureate in economics.
November 28 – 2002 Mombasa attacks: Three Israelis and 10 Kenyans are killed when a car bomb exploded in the lobby of the Israeli-owned beachfront Paradise Hotel, frequented almost exclusively by Israeli tourists near Mombasa in Kenya. 21 Israelis and 60 Kenyans are wounded in the attack. About 20 minutes earlier, an unsuccessful attempt is made to shoot down an Arkia Israel Airlines Boeing 757 chartered tourist plane taking off from nearby Moi International Airport using surface-to-air missiles; nobody is hurt on the plane, which lands safely in Tel Aviv. The main suspect for both attacks is al Qaeda.

Israeli–Palestinian conflict

(also see Second Intifada)

The most prominent events related to the Israeli–Palestinian conflict which occurred during 2002 include:
February 19 – Israel Defense Forces used explosives to destroy the five-storey main building and transmission tower of the Palestine Broadcasting Center in Ramallah claiming retaliation for the killing of six people by a Palestinian gunman linked to Fatah. The Israeli Government later singled out PBC for broadcasting material deemed to be anti-Semitic or that incited violence against Israeli citizens during the Second Intifada.
April – The Israeli government approved the construction of a continuous security barrier which would separate the Palestinians in the West Bank and the Israeli population centers, thus prevent the infiltration of Palestinian Arab terrorists, particularly suicide bombers into Israeli population centers. Palestinian Arab terror attacks on Israelis subsequently drop by 90%.
August 14 – The Palestinian leader Marwan Barghouti is sentenced to five life sentences after being convicted by a civilian Israeli court on charges of murdering Israeli civilians and membership in a terrorist organisation.

Palestinian militant operations against Israeli targets

The most prominent Palestinian militant acts and operations committed against Israeli targets during 2002 include:
January 9 – Two armed Palestinians from Hamas attack an IDF outpost in south Israel and kill four soldiers before being killed themselves.
January 18 – Bat Mitzvah massacre: An al-Aqsa Martyrs' Brigade (AMB) gunman opens fire on a Bat Mitzvah celebration at Hadera, killing six Israelis before being killed himself.
January 22 – AMB gunman kills two in West Jerusalem before being shot dead by police.
January 25 – Tel Aviv outdoor mall bombing: 20 people are injured by a suicide bomber from Islamic Jihad (PIJ) near the Old Tel Aviv Central Bus Station.
January 27 – Jaffa Street bombing: A suicide bombing attack in Jerusalem. An elderly Israeli is killed and 7 people are injured. The attack marks the first time a female suicide bomber is used. Fatah claims responsibility for the attack. Wafa Idriss had been working as a volunteer for the Palestinian Red Crescent.
January 30 – Tayibe bombing. Palestinian collaborator Murad Abu al-Asal detonates suicide bomb which injures his two Shin Bet handlers.
February 10 – Two Hamas gunmen kill two soldiers and wound four outside an army base in Beersheva before being shot dead.
February 14 – The AMB and PFLP both claim responsibility for a roadside bomb in Gaza which destroys a Merkava tank and kills 3 soldiers.
February 16 – Karnei Shomron Mall suicide bombing: Two Israeli teenagers are killed in a suicide bombing at a pizzeria in the Israeli settlement of Karnei Shomron in the northern West Bank. Another Israeli teenage girl is wounded in the attack and dies 11 days later. The PFLP claims responsibility.
February 18 – Ma'ale Adumim - Suicide car bombing. One soldier killed.
February 18 – Kissufim crossing - AMB suicide bomb kills three Jewish settlers.
February 19 – AMB gunman kills six Israeli soldiers at an army outpost north of Jerusalem. The gunman escapes.
February 22 – Efrat supermarket bombing attack. The attempt is foiled when the would-be bomber is shot dead by armed customers. No Israeli casualties.
February 27 – Maccabim bombing. A female suicide bomber armed by AMB, injures three soldiers.
March 2 – Yeshivat Beit Yisrael massacre: 11 people, including five children, are killed in an AMB suicide bombing near a yeshiva in the Haredi Beit Yisrael neighborhood in the center of Jerusalem.
March 3 – A sniper from AMB kills seven soldiers and three settlers at a checkpoint near Ofra. The gunman escapes.
March 4 – An AMB gunman kills three Israelis in Tel Aviv before being shot dead.
March 5 – Egged bus No. 823 bombing: An 85-year-old Israeli is killed when a suicide bomber blows himself up on an Egged bus No. 823 as it enters the Afula central bus station.
March 7 – Five Jewish settlers are killed and 23 are wounded by a Hamas gunman at Atzmona before he is shot dead. A PFLP suicide bomber injures five settlers in Ariel.
March 9 – Café Moment bombing: A Hamas suicide bomber detonates a powerful explosive device in a cafe in Jerusalem killing 11 Israelis and injuring 54 others. Two AMB gunmen kill two Israelis, plus one Israeli Arab, and wound 24, in Netanya before being shot dead.
March 14 – The AMB and PFLP both claim responsibility for a roadside bomb in Gaza which destroys a Merkava tank and kills 3 soldiers.
March 17 – Egged bus No. 22 bombing: a suicide bomber from PIJ attacks an Israeli bus in French Hill injured 9.
March 20 – Egged bus 823 bombing: Seven Israelis, four soldiers and three civilians, killed by a suicide bomber from PIJ on an Egged bus No. 823 traveling from Tel Aviv to Nazareth.
March 21 – King George Street bombing: Three Israelis are killed and 86 others are injured when an AMB suicide bomber detonated a bomb, packed with metal spikes and nails, in the center of a crowd of shoppers on King George Street in the center of Jerusalem.
March 27 – Passover massacre: A Hamas suicide bomber enters the dining room of the Park Hotel in Netanya, during the festive dinner for Passover arranged by the hotel for 250 guests, and detonates an explosive device. 30 people are killed and about 140 wounded, all civilians.
March 28 – Hamas suicide bomber kills four Jewish settlers at Elon Moreh.
March 29 – Kiryat HaYovel supermarket bombing: An 18-year-old Palestinian female suicide bomber blows herself up at the entrance of Kiryat HaYovel's main supermarket, killing two people and injuring 28.
March 29 – Gunman enters Netzarim settlement and kills two Jewish settlers.
March 30 – Allenby Street coffee shop bombing: An AMB suicide bomber explodes in a Tel Aviv café, wounding 32 people. President George W. Bush and Secretary of State Colin Powell (USA) call on Yasir Arafat to condemn the wave of suicide bombings in Arabic, to his own people. Israeli spokespeople make similar demands. Arafat goes on television and swears in Arabic that he will "die a martyr, a martyr, a martyr". Members of AMB state that they will refuse any form of cease-fire, and that they will continue suicide bombings of civilians in Israel.
March 31 – Matza restaurant suicide bombing: A Hamas-affiliated bomber blows himself up in an Arab-owned restaurant in Haifa, killing 15 (including two whole families) and injuring over 40 people.
March 31 – Efrat Medical Center bombing. Four Jewish settlers wounded.
April 1 – Jerusalem Roadblock bombing: A 19-year-old Israeli police volunteer is killed in Jerusalem, when a Palestinian Arab suicide bomber driving toward the city center blows himself up after being stopped at a roadblock. Fatah and the Al-Aqsa Martyrs' Brigades claim responsibility for the attack.
April 1 – Eleven Palestinian collaborators taken from Palestinian Authority prisons are killed.
April 9 – Thirteen Israeli soldiers killed, Jenin refugee camp, when a Palestinian fighter blows up the house they are in.
April 10 – Yagur Junction bombing: Eight Israelis, four soldiers and four civilians, are killed and 22 others are wounded in a Hamas suicide bombing on an Egged bus No. 960, en route from Haifa to Jerusalem, which exploded near Kibbutz Yagur, east of Haifa.
April 12 – Mahane Yehuda Market bombing: A Palestinian Arab female suicide bomber blows herself up at the entrance to Mahane Yehuda in Jerusalem, killing seven Israelis and injuring 104. The Al-Aqsa Martyrs' Brigades claims responsibility for the attack.
April 27 – Two Hamas fighters in Israeli army uniform kill five Jewish settlers in Adora. One of the attackers escapes.
May 7 – Rishon LeZion bombing: A Palestinian Arab suicide bomber kills 15 and wounds 58 in a billiards and illegal gambling club in Rishon LeZion. Hamas' military wing claims responsibility. The political wing does not confirm.
May 8 – A Palestinian Arab suicide bomber badly injures himself near Megiddo, southeast of Haifa, when the explosives he is carrying go off prematurely.
May 19 – Netanya Market bombing: A Popular Front for the Liberation of Palestine (PFLP) suicide bomber, disguised as an Israeli soldier, kills two Israelis and wounds more than 50 in Netanya.
May 20 – Afula road bombing. One Israeli patrol-man injured.
May 22 – Rothschild Street bombing: Two Israelis (one of them a teenager) are killed in an AMB suicide bombing in Rothschild Street in the center of Rishon LeZion.
May 23 – Pi Glilot bombing
May 24 – Studio 49 Disco bombing. An AMB suicide car bomb injures three.
May 27 – Petah Tikva Mall bombing: An Israeli woman and her infant granddaughter, aged 14 months, are killed and 37 injured when an AMB suicide bomber detonated himself near an ice cream parlor outside a shopping mall in Petah Tikva. The attacker was cousin of Nablus AMB commander assassinated May 22.
May 28 – Itamar. Palestinian gunman kills three Jewish settlers before being shot dead.
June 5 – Megiddo Junction bus bombing: 17 Israeli, fourteen soldiers and three civilians, are killed when a car packed with a large quantity of explosives struck Egged bus No. 830 traveling from Tel Aviv to Tiberias at the Megiddo junction near Afula. The car explodes near the gasoline tank of the bus, causing it to burst into flames. Most of the casualties are IDF soldiers who are on their way to their bases. PIJ claims responsibility for the attack.
June 7 – Karmei Tsur, Hebron. Two PFLP gunmen kill three Jewish settlers. One attacker is shot dead, the other escapes.
June 11 – Herzliya shawarma restaurant bombing: A suicide bomber sets off a bomb in a restaurant in the Israeli coastal suburb of Herzliya, killing a 14-year-old Israeli girl who was walking past the restaurant and wounding 15 others.
June 18 – Patt Junction Bus Bombing: A Hamas-affiliated Islamic law student boards an Egged bus No. 32A in Jerusalem and blows himself up with an explosive belt filled with metal balls for shrapnel. 19 Israelis killed, including one Arab, and over 74 wounded.
June 19 – French Hill Junction massacre: Seven Israelis, including a five-year-old girl and her grandmother, are killed when a suicide bomber blows himself up at a crowded bus stop and hitchhiking post at the French Hill intersection in northern Jerusalem.
June 20 – Itamar attack
July 16 – Immanuel bus attack: Nine Israelis, including an infant child, are killed in an attack on Dan bus No. 189 traveling from Bnei Brak to Emmanuel in the northern West Bank. Two 20-kilo bombs are set off about 200 meters from the town's entrance, damaging the bus's front tires and forcing it off the road. The explosion damage the bus doors, trapping the passengers inside. The militants then started shooting at the bus, firing through the unprotected roof and throwing grenades through the narrow upper windows, which were not armored. AMB and PFLP claim responsibility.
July 17 – Neve Shaanan Street bombing: Five people, two Israelis and two foreign workers, are killed and about 40 others are wounded in a double IJ suicide bombing on Neve Sha'anan Street near the Old Tel Aviv Central Bus Station.
July 26 – AMB gunmen fire on two vehicles near Hebron. Four Jewish settlers killed.
July 30 – Nevi'im Street bombing. Five wounded.
July 31 – Hebrew University massacre: A Hamas-affiliated member leaves a bag containing a bomb in the cafeteria of Hebrew University of Jerusalem, killing nine Jewish students (four Israeli, four American, one dual French/American), and injuring 85 others (different nationalities, including Arabs). Palestinian Arabs rally in Gaza waving Hamas flags to celebrate the attack. On August 17, Israeli Security Forces expose a terrorist cell of Hamas operatives in East Jerusalem that had been responsible for the attack. The members had been planning another attack at the time of their arrest.
August 4 – Meron Junction Bus 361 attack: Nine people, three Israeli soldiers, two Israeli civilians, two Israeli Arabs and two Philippine workers, are killed in a Hamas suicide bombing on an Egged bus No. 361 traveling from Haifa to Safed at the Meron junction in northern Israel. Forty others, mostly soldiers, are injured.
August 5 – Umm al-Fahm junction bombing. Bomber killed, his accomplice injured. No other casualties.
September 5 – Gaza Strip. Two Israeli soldiers killed by a bomb under their Merkava tank.
September 18 – Umm al-Fahm bombing: An Israeli policeman is killed and three others are wounded in a PIJ suicide bombing at a bus stop at the Umm al-Fahm junction.
September 19 – Allenby Street bus bombing: A Hamas suicide bomber kills five Israelis and wounds more than 50 on a bus next to Tel Aviv's Great Synagogue.
October 10 – Geha road bombing: A Hamas suicide bomber kills a 71-year-old Israeli woman and injures several other at a bus stop at Bar Ilan Junction.
October 11 – United States embassy guards in Tel Aviv, stop a Palestinian Arab suicide bomber from setting off a bomb in a crowded beachfront cafe.
October 21 – Karkur junction suicide bombing:  A suicide attack carried out by two members of the PIJ in the Israeli urban area of Wadi Ara. 14 Israelis are killed in the attack and 40 are wounded.
October 27 – Sonol gas station bombing: Three Israeli soldiers are killed in a Hamas suicide bombing at a gas station at the entrance to Ariel in the northern West Bank. About 20 people were wounded in the bombing. The soldiers were restraining the bomber when two settlers shot him detonating the bomb.
November 4 – Kfar Saba shopping mall bombing: Two Israelis, a security guard and a civilian, are killed by a PIJ suicide bomber whom detonates himself at a Kfar Saba shopping mall.
November 10 – AMB gunmen kills five Israelis in a kibbutz, north Israel. The gunman escapes.
November 15 – Hebron ambush: Palestinian gunmen from PIJ ambush a detail of soldiers, border police and settler security officials close to the Ibrahim Mosque, Hebron. Three of the gunmen and 12 Israelis (4 soldiers, 5 border police, 3 settler guards) are killed, including the Israeli army commander in Hebron, Colonel Dror Weinberg.
November 21 – Kiryat Menachem bus bombing: A Hamas-affiliated suicide bomber blows himself up on a crowded Egged bus No. 20 in Jerusalem, killing eleven people, and wounding over 50.
November 22 – Two PIJ suicide bombers injure four Israeli soldiers in a patrol boat, Gaza.
November 27 – Gaza: PFLP suicide bomber. No Israelis injured.
November 28 – Beit She'an attack: Six Israelis are killed when two AMB gunmen open fire and throw grenades at the Likud polling station in Bet She'an, where party members are casting their votes in the Likud primary.
December 27 – Two PIJ gunmen enter Otniel settlement killing two Jewish settlers and two Israeli soldiers.

Israeli military operations against Palestinian militancy targets

The most prominent Israeli military counter-terrorism operations (military campaigns and military operations) carried out against Palestinian militants during 2002 include:

January 2 – Karine A Affair: IDF Shayetet 13 naval commando captures the Palestinian Authority owned freighter "Karin A" in the Red Sea, which was on its way to the shores of the Gaza Strip. The vessel is found to be carrying 50 tons of weapons from Iran believed to be intended for Palestinian militants' use against Israelis. The weapons found on the ship include short-range Katyusha rockets, antitank missiles and high explosives.
January 12 – The Israeli army assassinates al-Aqsa Martyrs' Brigade member Ra'id Karmi in Tulkarm.
January 22 – The Israeli army kills West Bank leader of Izz ad-Din al-Qassam Brigade (IQB), Yusaf Suragji, with three other Hamas members in Nablus.
January 22 – The Israeli army fire missiles at a car in Khan Yunis killing senior Hamas member Adil Hamdan (Bakr Hamdan). Another six Palestinians are killed in other incidents.
February 1 – The Israeli army demolish the Palestine Broadcasting Center in Gaza City. Six Palestinians are killed in Brazil Refugee Camp.
February 4 – The Israeli army fires missiles at a car near Rafah, killing five members of the PFLP including wanted man Ayman Bihdari.
February 16 – In Jenin the Israeli army use a remote-controlled bomb to kill Nazih al-Siba', a local Hamas leader.
February 19 – The Israeli navy fire a missile into Yasser Arafat's compound in Gaza City killing 4 members of Force 17. Later in the day the army fire 18 shells into the compound killing 5 Preventive Security Force (PSF) officers.
February 20 – An Israeli army incursion into Nablus kills nine Palestinians. A further seven Palestinians are killed in other incidents.
February 28 – Operation Colorful Journey. The Israeli army attacks Balata refugee camp and Jenin. At least eleven Palestinians are killed, including Balata AMB leader Kayid Abu Mustafa and six PSF officers.
March 4 – In an apparent attempt to kill Hamas politician, Hussein Abu Kuwayk, the Israeli army fires rockets at a truck in Ramallah killing his wife and 3 children as well as two bystanders.
March 5 – Israeli helicopters fire a missile at a car in Ramallah killing three, including AMB members Muhannad Abu Halawa and Fawzi Murrar.
March 6 – Thirteen Palestinians are killed in various incidents. Those killed included senior Hamas member 'Abd al-Nassar Ghazal.
March 7 – Sixteen Palestinians are killed in various incidents, including two ambulance workers.
March 8 – Khuza'a, Khan Yunis. The Israeli army kill 16 Palestinians including PSF regional commander Major General Ahmad Mifraj. A further 24 Palestinians are killed in other incidents in the West Bank and Gaza Strip. The highest single-day death toll since the al-Aqsa intifada began.
March 11 – An Israeli army raid into Jabaliya Refugee Camp kills 18 Palestinians. A further six Palestinians are killed elsewhere.
March 12 – 20,000 Israeli soldiers with 150 tanks attack Amari, Ramallah. 30 Palestinians killed during the day.
March 14 – Six Palestinians killed in Tulkarm including senior AMB member Mutasim Makhluf.
Operation Defensive Shield (March 29 – May 3, 2002) – Large-scale counter-terrorist operation conducted by the IDF into Palestinian towns and villages in the West Bank aimed to halt Palestinian suicide bombings against civilians in Israel during the Second Intifada, which results in extensive damage to terrorist infrastructure and an important decrease of Palestinian attacks.
Battle of Jenin (April 1–11) – Israel attacked Palestinian militants in the city of Jenin.
Battle of Bethlehem (April 2 – May 10) – Israel occupied Bethlehem and tried to capture wanted Palestinian militants who were hiding in the Church of the Nativity.
Battle of Nablus (April 3–8) – Israel attacked Palestinian militants in the city of Nablus.
April 3 – Israeli army kill six Palestinians in Jenin. One Israeli reservist killed.
April 5 – IQB regional commander, Qays Udwan, and five other Hamas members, are killed by the Israeli army in Tubas. Twelve Palestinians are killed in Nablus when the Israeli army destroy large sections of the eastern market area.
April 6 – At least fifty Palestinians and five Israeli soldiers are killed as Operation Defensive Shield continues.
April 7 – At least 14 Palestinians are killed by the Israeli army in Nablus.
April 7 – Ansar III prison camp for Palestinian detainees is re-opened.
April 8 – Israeli army kill 30 Palestinians in Jenin Refugee Camp. Two Israeli soldiers are killed.
April 10 – The Israeli army kill eleven Palestinian in Nablus old city.
April 15 – Palestinian political figure Marwan Barghouti, who was accused by the Israeli authorities of the murder of Israeli civilians and attacks on Israeli soldiers, is captured by the Israel Defense Forces in Palestinian Authority administered city of Ramallah.
April 22 – Israeli army in Hebron assassinate senior AMB member Marwan Zallum.
April 24 – Senior AMB member Yacub Sarayra is assassinated in Bani Na'im. A second Palestinian is also killed.
April 26 – Local Qalqilya PFLP leader, Ra'id Nazil is killed in an Israeli army raid.
April 28 – Two Jewish settlers are arrested attempting to place a bomb at the Maqasid Hospital, Jerusalem.
April 29 – The Israeli army launch a major pre-dawn incursion into Hebron. Ten Palestinians are killed, including wanted Hamas member, Tarik al-Dufashi.
May 1 – Six Palestinians trapped in Yasser Arafat's compound in Ramallah, who were wanted by the Israelis, surrender themselves into British/US custody.
May 3 – Israeli army raid Nablus house and kill senior Hamas member, Ali Hudairi, and four others. One Israeli soldier is killed.
May 14 – Israeli army assassinates two Palestinian intelligence officers, Halhul.
May 16 – Beitunia. The Israeli army assassinates wanted PSF officer Ahmad Ghanem.
May 22 – Israeli army fire rockets, assassinating AMB Nablus commander Mahmud Titi, in Balata refugee camp. Two other AMB members and a bystander are also killed. IJ member, Khalid Zakami, is killed in an unexplained explosion, Jenin.
June 12 – The Israeli army kill eight Palestinians in Gaza.
June 17 – Israeli army assassinate local al Khadir AMB leader, Walid Sbeh.
June 18 – Islamic Jihad (PIJ) Student leader, Yusif Bisharat, is assassinated by the Israeli army in Hebron.
June 19 – Israeli army starts barring all Palestinians with West Bank ID cards from entering Jerusalem.
June 22 – Operation Determined Path begins.
June 24 – Israeli army assassinate two IQB leaders, Yasir Raziq and 'Amr Kufa. The two drivers of the cars destroyed in the missile attack, as well as a further two passengers, are also killed. Thirteen bystanders are injured.
June 24 – US halt all direct dealing with Yasser Arafat for allegedly funding June 19, French Hill, suicide attack.
June 30 – Senior AMB member, Muhammad Tahir, is assassinated by the Israeli army in Nablus. A member of Hamas is also killed.
July 4 – Senior AMB members, Jihad al-Omarayn and Wa'il al-Nimral are killed by a bomb in their car. Presumed to be an Israeli assassination.
July 9 – PIJ member, Mu'ammar Daraghma, is fatally shot by Israeli soldiers while driving near Jenin in a presumed assassination.
July 22 – An Israeli warplane fires a one-ton bomb at an apartment in a densely populated neighborhood of Gaza City, killing Salah Shehade, top commander of Hamas's military wing (the Izz ad-Din al-Qassam Brigades), who headed Israel's most wanted list and whom Israel accuses of masterminding several terror attacks against Israeli soldiers and civilians in the Gaza strip and in Israel proper during the Al-Aqsa Intifada. The apartment building is flattened and 14 civilians are killed, including Shehade's wife and nine children. The attack occurred hours after AMB, Tanzim, Hamas, and IJ had agreed to declare a unilateral cease-fire.
July 28 – Curfew in Nablus lifted for the fifth time in forty days.
August 2 – Israeli army execute Hamas member, Amjad Jabour, outside his home, Salim, Nablus.
August 5 – Burqa village. Israeli army assassinate AMB member, Khalid Sayf. A Palestinian bystander is also killed.
August 6 – Jenin. AMB members Ali Ajuri and Murad Marshud, assassinated by air to surface missile.
August 7 – Israeli army commandos assassinate Tulkarm local AMB commander, Ziad Da'as. Two Palestinian bystanders also killed.
August 7 – Khan Yunis. An Israeli army sniper kills Hamas member Hussam Hamdan, son of top Hamas political leader Ahmad Nimr.
August 12 – Yamun, Jenin. Israeli soldiers take AMB member Ghazal Frayhat into custody before fatally shooting him.
August 14 – Tubas. Israeli army fire rockets into a house killing senior Hamas member Nasir Jarrar. The victim was reliant on a wheelchair having lost one arm and both legs in previous Israeli attempts to kill him.
August 19 – Israeli army hands control of Bethlehem back to the PSF.
August 20 – Ramallah. Israeli commandos assassinate senior PFLP member Muhammad Saadat, brother of the head of the PFLP, Ahmad Saadat.
August 20 – Tulkarm. Israeli army assassinates tanzim member, Afsam Salim.
August 23 – Israeli army kill AMB Jenin commander Muhammad al-Ott, in a shoot-out.
August 31 – Tubas. Israeli army fire four missiles at a car in an attempt to assassinate local AMB leader, Jihad Sawafta. Kills one AMB member, Rafat Daraghma and two teenagers in the car. One missile strikes a house killing two children.
September 1 – Israeli army shoot dead four unarmed Palestinians in Hebron.
September 10 – Israeli army raid kills wanted Palestinian Mahmud Harfush.
September 13 – Gaza. Unexplained explosion kills three Palestinians including wanted Fatah member Iyad Sharif.
September 19 – Operation Matter of Time to isolate Yasser Arafat.
September 24 – 90 Israeli tanks with bulldozers and helicopters move into Gaza City and Bayt Lahia. Nine Palestinians are killed, including local AMB leader Muhammad Kishku and senior IQB member Yasin Nassar.
September 26 – Israeli army fire two missiles at two carts in an attempt to assassinate most wanted member of IQB, Muhammad Dayif. Two Hamas members killed and thirty bystanders injured.
September 26 – Tulkarm. Israeli army kill senior Hamas member Nashat Abu Jabara and demolish his home. One Israeli soldier killed.
September 27 – Near Hebron. Israeli army kill wanted Palestinian Muhammad Yaghmur.
September 29 – Israeli army end siege of Yasser Arafat's compound in Ramallah.
October 6 – PIJ member Samir Nursi killed in Jenin refugee camp following exchange of fire with Israeli soldiers.
October 7 – Israeli army sends 40 tanks with helicopters into Khan Yunis. Fourteen Palestinians killed.
October 12 – AMB member Muhammad Ubayyat killed by exploding phone, in what is believed to have been an Israeli attempt to assassinate his brother, Bethlehem tanzim commander Nassir Ubayyat.
October 14 – Nablus. Two PIJ members, Wassim Saba'na and Muhammad Musa, assassinated.
October 17 – Israeli army shells residential area of Rafah. Six Palestinians killed, including two women, two teenagers and a nine-year-old.
October 25 – Hundreds of Israeli soldiers, backed by scores of tanks and other military vehicles, take control of the Palestinian Authority administered city of Jenin in response to a suicide bombing that killed 14 people.
October 29 – Tubas. Israeli army undercover unit assassinate senior Hamas member Asim Sawafta.
October 30 – Nablus. Israeli commandos assassinate PA intelligence officer, Ajid Mansur.
October 31 – Jenin. Operation Vanguard. Ends November 10.
October 32 – Three Hamas members killed in an explosion. Hamas spokesman, Abdel Aziz al-Rantissi acknowledges that they were probably preparing a bomb.
November 4 – Nablus. Israeli army fire missile at a car assassinating wanted Hamas member Hamid Sidr. Another Hamas member, Firas Abu Ghazala is also killed.
November 9 – Jenin. Israeli army assassinates PIJ leader Iyad Sawalha in a raid on his house.
November 15 – Tulkarm. Israeli army undercover unit assassinate Hamas member Mahmud Obeid.
November 17 – Israeli army undercover unit attempt to kill Riad 'Abd al Ghani, in Tulkarm. Kill his brother.
November 19 – Israeli army assassinates AMB member Tariq Zaghal in Tulkarm. Three bystanders killed.
November 22 – Senior UNRWA official Iain Hook is shot dead by an Israeli army sniper while inside the UNRWA compound in Jenin refugee camp.
November 26 – An Israeli rocket attack on a house in Jenin refugee camp kills AMB Jenin commander Ala' Ahmad Sabbagh and IQB Jenin commander Imad Nasharti.
December 4 – Israeli army fire five missiles into a building in Gaza City killing Palestine Resistance Committee (PRC) member Mustafa Sabah who is reported to be the inventor of an anti-tank bomb used in earlier attacks.
December 4 – In Hebron the Israeli army shoot dead two PIJ members, Sami Shawer and Ahmad Srour.
December 6 – Forty Israeli tanks enter Bureji refugee camp searching for PRC leader Ayman Shishniyya. Kill ten Palestinians including two UNRWA workers.
December 7 – Israeli army assassinate PIJ member 'Abd al-Hadi Omar near Jenin.
December 10 – In a possible assassination in Khan Yunis the Israeli army kill Hamas member Yasin al-Agha. In Balata refugee camp the Israeli army kill wanted Palestinian Usama Badra.
December 12 – Gaza Strip. Israeli army shell-fire kills five unarmed labourers.
December 13 – Nur al-Shams refugee camp. Israeli army assassinates Hamas's Tulkarm military commander, Tariq 'Abid Rabbuh.
December 13 – Bethlehem. Israeli army kill Hamas member Jadallah Shuka.
December 16 – The Israeli army shoots dead two armed Hamas members trying to enter Israel from the Gaza Strip. Elsewhere in the Gaza Strip the Israeli army kill two civilians in separate incidents.
December 23 – Jenin. Israeli army assassinates two wanted Hamas members. Shaman Suduh and Mustafa Baqash.
December 25 – Nablus. Israeli army shoot senior Hamas member, Talib Abu Hawash. He bleeds to death after being denied medical attention over several hours.
December 26 – Tulkarm. Israeli army assassinate local AMB head Jamal Yahya. In Ramallah a car is ambushed killing Hamas member Bassam Ashqar. In Qabatiyya local PIJ leader, Yusif Abu Rub, is also assassinated. An Israeli undercover enter a hospital in Ramallah and kill wanted man, Samir al-Shamali, who was working as a guard. Six other Palestinians are killed by the Israeli army during the day.

Notable deaths

April 10 – Haim Cohn (born 1911), German-born Israeli jurist and politician.
October 2 – Haim Yosef Zadok (born 1913), Austro-Hungarian (Galicia)-born Israeli jurist and politician.
October 11 – Maxim Levy (born 1950), Moroccan-born Israeli politician.
October 15 – Yaakov (Ze'ev) Farkash (born 1923), Hungarian-born Israeli cartoonist and illustrator.
September 7 – Uziel Gal (born 1923), German-born Israeli gun designer best remembered as the designer and namesake of the Uzi submachine gun.
November 11 – Yisrael Amir (born 1903), Russian (Lithuania)-born Israeli Haganah member, first commander of the Israeli Air Force.
November 11 – Esther Raziel-Naor (born 1911), Russian (Belarus)-born Israeli jurist and politician.
November 17 – Abba Eban (born 1915), South African-born Israeli foreign affair minister.
Full date unknown – Yaakov Ben-Tor (born 1910), German-born Israeli geologist.

Major public holidays

See also
2002 in Israeli film
Israel at the 2002 Winter Olympics
2002 in the Palestinian territories

References

External links

IDF History in 2002 @ dover.idf.il

 
2000s in Israel
Israel
Israel
Years of the 21st century in Israel